Starominsky District is an administrative district (raion), one of the thirty-eight in Krasnodar Krai, Russia. As a municipal division, it is incorporated as Starominsky Municipal District. It is located in the north of the krai. Its administrative center is the rural locality (a stanitsa) of Starominskaya. Population:  The population of Starominskaya accounts for 73.1% of the district's total population.

References

Notes

Sources

Districts of Krasnodar Krai